Jon & Robin were an American pop music duo from the 1960s, composed of Jon Abdnor Junior and Javonne "Robin" Braga. The group recorded for Abdnor's father's label, Abnak Records. Wayne Carson Thompson (famous for writing The Box Tops' hit "The Letter") wrote several of the band's tunes, including their one national US hit single, 1967's "Do it Again a Little Bit Slower" (US #18)  and "Dr. Jon (The Medicine Man)", which was a regional hit in Texas and the American South. They were often backed by Bobby Patterson and the Five Americans, other Abnak artists, on their recordings. In 1969, Jon Abdnor released a solo album after the duo had parted ways.

Discography

Studio albums
Elastic Event (Abnak Records, 1967)
Soul of a Boy and Girl (Abnak, 1967)
Intro to Change (Jon Howard Abdnor & The Involvement; Abnak, 1969)

Compilation albums
Do It Again! The Best of Jon & Robin (Sundazed Records, 2006)

References

External links

American pop music groups
American musical duos